Schülp may refer to the following places in Schleswig-Holstein, Germany:

Schülp, Dithmarschen, in the district of Dithmarschen
Schülp bei Rendsburg, in the district of Rendsburg-Eckernförde
Schülp bei Nortorf, in the district of Rendsburg-Eckernförde